Margaux Pinot (born 6 January 1994) is a French judoka. 
In 2020, she won the gold medal in the women's 70 kg event at the 2020 European Judo Championships held in Prague, Czech Republic. In 2021, she competed in the women's 70 kg event at the 2020 Summer Olympics in Tokyo, Japan.

She is the 2017 European silver medalist in the 63 kg division.

She won the gold medal in her event at the 2022 Judo Grand Slam Paris held in Paris, France.

On 12 November 2022 she won a gold medal at the 2022 European Mixed Team Judo Championships as part of team France.

References

External links

 
 

1994 births
Living people
Sportspeople from Besançon
French female judoka
Universiade medalists in judo
Competitors at the 2018 Mediterranean Games
Mediterranean Games bronze medalists for France
Mediterranean Games medalists in judo
Universiade bronze medalists for France
Judoka at the 2019 European Games
European Games medalists in judo
European Games gold medalists for France
European Games bronze medalists for France
Medalists at the 2015 Summer Universiade
Judoka at the 2020 Summer Olympics
Medalists at the 2020 Summer Olympics
Olympic medalists in judo
Olympic gold medalists for France
Olympic judoka of France
21st-century French women
20th-century French women